The 1987 Autoglass 1000 km was the fourth round of the 1987 World Sports-Prototype Championship.  It took place at the Silverstone Circuit, United Kingdom on May 10, 1987.

Official results
Class winners in bold.  Cars failing to complete 75% of the winner's distance marked as Not Classified (NC).

Statistics
 Pole Position - #17 Porsche AG - 1:15.110
 Fastest Lap - #4 Silk Cut Jaguar - 1:18.120
 Average Speed - 198.627 km/h

References

 
 

Silverstone
Silverstone
6 Hours of Silverstone
May 1987 sports events in the United Kingdom